The Bukharan markhor, or  Tadjik markhor (Capra falconeri heptneri) is an endangered goat-antelope, native to Tajikistan, Turkmenistan and Uzbekistan, possibly also Afghanistan.
Today it is found in few scattered populations, for example in Kugitang Nature Reserve in easternmost Turkmenistan. The population of the Bukharan markhor is at around 5,750 animals.

See also
Markhor
Astor markhor
Kabul markhor

References 

Capra (genus)
Mammals of Central Asia
Mammals of Pakistan